Sabeco World Trade Center is the unofficial name of a skyscraper proposed to be constructed in 2010 at 2-4-6 Hai Ba Trung, District 1, Ho Chi Minh City, Vietnam. This tower, which was not developed, was expected to have 40 floors, feature a traditional Vietnamese house, and be one of the highest buildings in Vietnam. The architect of the tower was Architect HOK International. , the highest building in Vietnam is Bitexco Financial Tower in Ho Chi Minh City. Saigon Plaza will include offices, entertainment, shopping malls, hotel and a convention hall. The name “World Trade Center” is a trademark owned by World Trade Centers Association  (WTCA), and is used under license by WTCA's global network of members in nearly 100 countries.  The former Sabeco project was not licensed or authorized by WTCA.

Office and retail supermarket in Vietnam
During 2000–2007, Vietnam achieved an economic growth of 8-8.5%, leading to the increasing demand of office and shopping spaces in big cities like Ho Chi Minh City, Hanoi, Danang, Haiphong. Land and housing prices in these cities are unproportionate to the GDP per capita in the country.

Top 10 highest buildings under construction/approve in Vietnam
List of tallest buildings in Vietnam
PVN Tower in Hanoi, 528 meters, 102 stories scheduled for completion in 2014.
Saigon Centre phase 2 is twin tower in Ho Chi Minh City, 88 stories and 66 stories.
Keangnam Hanoi Landmark Tower in Hanoi, 70 stories, 343 m, scheduled for completion in 2011.
Bitexco Financial Tower in Ho Chi Minh City, 68 stories and 3 basements, 269 m to the top roof, scheduled for completion in 2010.
Lotte Center Hanoi in Hanoi, 65 stories, 267 m, scheduled for completion in 2013.
Vien Dong Meridian Tower is twin tower in Danang, 220m, 48 stories and 3 basements, scheduled for completion in 2012.
Saigon M&C in Ho Chi Minh City, 42 stories, 185m, scheduled for completion in 2011.
Diamond Flower Tower in Hanoi, 40 stories, 177m, scheduled for completion in 2012.
Sabeco World Trade Center in Ho Chi Minh City, 40 stories, 170.5 m, scheduled for construction in 2010.
Saigon Times Square in Ho Chi Minh City, 39 stories, 165m, scheduled for completion in 2011.

References

Office buildings completed in 2013
2010 in Vietnam
Skyscrapers in Ho Chi Minh City
Buildings and structures in Ho Chi Minh City
Proposed skyscrapers
World Trade Centers
Proposed buildings and structures in Vietnam